Moroccan League may refer to:

Sports
 Botola, Morocco's top-tier professional football league
 Botola 2, Morocco's second-tier football league
 GNFA 1, Morocco's third-tier football league
 Nationale 1, men's basketball league